Scottine Ross (born May 21, 1989), known professionally as Brett Rossi and formerly Scottine Sheen, is an American glamour model, entertainer, dancer and pornographic film actress.

Career
In 2012, Rossi was signed by the adult film company Twistys and named the February Penthouse Pet.

After a several year hiatus in the industry, Rossi appeared on Vivid Radio announcing her return to the adult industry and stated that she would begin her first feature dance tour back into the business by February 2016. On February 1, 2016, it was announced that she had signed a contract to become the face of Kayden Kross and Stoya's new company TrenchcoatX.
She has performed in over 170 adult movie titles, primarily lesbian films, as well as having directed an adult film titled Girl Crushed 2.

Rossi has used her platform to call into question the treatment of porn stars regarding their sexual abuse experiences in an interview with Amanda Knox and another publication.

Personal life 
From November 2013 to October 2014, she dated actor Charlie Sheen. They announced their engagement in February 2014 and had a wedding planned later in the year. They broke off their engagement in October. A month later, it was reported that Rossi was hospitalized for an apparent drug overdose. In 2015, Rossi sued Sheen after his announcement of being HIV positive and for various other allegations such as "assault and battery, emotional distress, false imprisonment and negligence".

Awards and nominations

Filmography

Music videos

References

External links

 
 
 
 
 AVN profile
 101 Modeling profile

1989 births
American female adult models
American pornographic film actresses
Living people
Penthouse Pets
Pornographic film actors from California
People from La Verne, California
21st-century American women